Robert Steven Shimp (born April 30, 1976, in Montgomery, Alabama) is an American record engineer and producer.  He was an engineer for Toast Studios from 1996 until they closed their doors. He is known for his work with the West Coast rock band The Donnas, for whom he was a live engineer turned producer, and was an engineer For R.E.M.'s Up. In 2018, Robert Shimp opened his own recording studio, Technical Earth Recorders, in Montgomery, Alabama.

Discography 
1997: Revenge is Sweet, and So Are You - The Mr. T Experience
1998: Not Feeling Quite Like Yourself Today? - Clone
1998: Get Down! - The Hi-Fives
1998: Up - R.E.M.
1999: "Strutter" Detroit Rock City OST - The Donnas
1999: "Keep On Loving You" Drive Me Crazy OST - The Donnas
1999: Bomb - Lovesucker
1999: Get Skintight - The Donnas
2000: On the List - The Plus Ones
2001: "Do You Wanna Hit It" Lookout! Freakout Episode 2 - The Donnas
2001: The Donnas Turn 21 - The Donnas
2001: Going Dutch - The Plus Ones
2002: Spend the Night - The Donnas
2002: Its a Calling - The Plus Ones
2003: Who Invited You - The Donnas
2003: "Backstage" Freaky Friday OST - The Donnas
2003: "It's on the Rocks" How to Deal OST - The Donnas
2003: "Who Invited You" What a Girl Wants OST - The Donnas
2004: "Skintight" Second-Hand Suit Jacket Racket - The Donnas
2004: "Dancing With Myself" Mean Girls OST - The Donnas
2004: "Please Don't Tease" New York Minute OST - The Donnas
2005: Me and Otto - Kissinger
2005: Up - R.E.M.
2005: "Skintight", "Hyperactive", "Party Action", "40 Boys In 40 Nights", "Play My Game", "Are You Gonna Move It for Me?" The Early Years - The Donnas
2006: "Play My Game" Rollergirls OST - The Donnas
2007: "Take It Off" Coolest Songs in the World, Vol. 2 - The Donnas
2008: We Are What We Pretend To Be - The Fatal Flaw
2008: "Too Fast for Love" Under the Covers: Classic Lookout! Records Cover Songs - The Donnas
2009: "Play My Game", "Hey, I'm Gonna Be Your Girl", "I Wanna Be with a Girl Like You" Greatest Hits Vol. 16 - The Donnas
2009: "Take It Off" The Hangover OST - The Donnas
2009: "Dancing with Myself" I Love You Man (film) OST - The Donnas
2009: "Skintight", "Do You Wanna Hit It" Lookout! Records: 20 Collection - The Donnas
2009: "Are You Gonna Move It for Me?" Be on the Lookout! - The Donnas

References

External links 

Record producers from Alabama
American audio engineers
People from Montgomery, Alabama
1976 births
Living people